Abdul Halim Chowdhury (1 February 1928 – 7 October 1987) was a Bangladesh Nationalist Party politician, Member of Parliament, and government minister. He is a retired captain of Pakistan Army and fought in the Bangladesh Liberation War.

Early life
Chowdhury was born on 1 February 1928 in Elachipur, Shivalaya, Manikganj, Bengal Presidency, British India. He graduated from Faridpur Zilla School. He went on to Rajshahi College, finished his BA in economics from Rajshahi University. He started his master's degree at Dhaka University.

Career
Chowdhury joined the Pakistan army in 1950 while still a student. In the army he served as the Adjutant and Quarter Master in the 1st Punjab Regiment. He served as the aide-de-camp to the GOC of the 14th division. He was the commanding officer of University Officers' Training Corps Battalion in East Pakistan. In 1962 he retired from the Army over health reasons. He joined the East Pakistan Industrial Development Corporation. He was placed in charged of setting up a sugar mill in Kushtia.

In 1966, he joined the National Awami Party. In the 1970 Pakistani general election he stood as a nominee of the National Awami Party faction led by Muzaffar Ahmed (NAP (M)).

During the Bangladesh Liberation War in 1971 he helped set up the revolutionary committee of Manikganj. He was placed in charge of military operations in Dhaka Sadar and Gazipur. He established the Halim Bahini, a paramilitary force under his command, to fight in the Bangladesh Liberation war. After the Independence of Bangladesh, he stood again as a NAP (M) candidate in the 1973 Bangladeshi general election. He became the president of United People's Party. In 1979 he was elected to Parliament from the Bangladesh Nationalist Party. He served in the cabinet of President Ziaur Rahman as the minister of Local Government, Rural Development and Cooperative. He later was in the cabinet of President Abdus Sattar as the minister of Food and Relief. He was a member of BNP's National executive committee. He joined General Hussain Muhammad Ershad's Jatiya party after it came to power. He was the minister of Agriculture and Food.

Chowdhury died on 7 October 1987.

References

1928 births
1987 deaths
University of Rajshahi alumni
Bangladesh Nationalist Party politicians
Bangladeshi military personnel
Mukti Bahini personnel
2nd Jatiya Sangsad members
Place of death missing